= Saray-Chekurcha =

Saray-Chekurcha may refer to:

- Saray-Chekurcha, Republic of Tatarstan, a village (selo) in the Republic of Tatarstan, Russia
- Zheleznodorozhnogo razyezda Saray-Chekurcha, a settlement in the Republic of Tatarstan, Russia
